DEAR1 is a name for multiple unrelated genes:

 DEAR1 (plant) - "DREB and EAR motif protein 1", a plant gene for immunity against infection and arthropods
 TRIM62